Saint-Pantaly-d'Excideuil (literally Saint-Pantaly of Excideuil) is a commune in the Dordogne department in Nouvelle-Aquitaine in the southwestern part of France.

Population

See also
Communes of the Dordogne department

References

Communes of Dordogne
Arrondissement of Périgueux